"Kevlarsjäl" is a song by Swedish alternative rock band Kent. It was released in September 2000 as the third single from the album Hagnesta Hill.

The single has the non album track "Längtan skala 3:1" that was specially recorded for an Amnesty charity album. The two other b-sides are two songs from the English version of Hagnesta Hill that were not recorded in Swedish.

Track listing

CD single (Maxi)
 Kevlarsjäl 4:26
 Längtan Skala 3:1 6:53
 Just Like Money 4:16
 Quiet Heart 5:23

Promo CD sleeve single
 Kevlarsjäl 4:26
 Insekter 4:08

Charts

References

2000 singles
Kent (band) songs
Songs written by Joakim Berg
2000 songs
RCA Victor singles